Francesco Galeoto (born March 17, 1972) is an Italian football defender.

Career
After spending his early years as a youth player for hometown club Palermo, he left for Cerveteri in 1993. Since then, he played for several Serie B and Serie C1 teams, including Trapani, Palermo (where he returned in 1995), Salernitana, Pescara and Taranto. In 2002, he signed for Treviso, playing there for four seasons, and making eleven appearances in the Italian Serie A during the first half of the 2005-06 season. In January 2006 he moved to Arezzo, and then to Genoa twelve months later, winning a personal second promotion to Serie A in the 2006-07 Serie B. In July 2007 he signed for Messina, and spent the 2007–08 season with the giallorossi.

He was released for free during the summer 2008 transfer window as a consequence of the disbandment of his club, and was signed by Lega Pro Prima Divisione's Crotone in August 2008.

In September 2010, he was signed by Barletta as free agent, after released by Crotone on 1 July.

In September 2011, a 38-year-old Galeoto decided to quit professional football and join Eccellenza amateurs Atletico Campofranco.

References

External links

1972 births
Living people
Footballers from Palermo
Italian footballers
Association football defenders
Palermo F.C. players
U.S. Salernitana 1919 players
Delfino Pescara 1936 players
Taranto F.C. 1927 players
Treviso F.B.C. 1993 players
S.S. Arezzo players
Genoa C.F.C. players
F.C. Crotone players
A.C.R. Messina players
A.S.D. Barletta 1922 players
Serie A players